"Evil Ways" is a song made famous by Mexican-American rock band Santana from their 1969 self-titled debut album. It was written by Clarence "Sonny" Henry and originally recorded by jazz percussionist Willie Bobo on his 1967 album Bobo Motion. Alongside Santana's release in 1969, "Evil Ways" was also recorded by the band The Village Callers. The lyrics of the song are written in simple verse form.

Released as a single in late 1969, it became Santana's first top 40 and top 10 hit in the US, peaking at #9 on the Billboard Hot 100 the week of March 21, 1970. Gregg Rolie performs the lead vocals and plays a Hammond organ solo in the middle section. The double-time coda includes a guitar solo performed by Carlos Santana, who also does the backing vocals.

Other notable recordings and samples
Johnny Mathis released the song as a single in 1970. It made the Cash Box survey at number 118, and also appeared on MOR music surveys in Billboard (#30) and Record World.

Jazz saxophonist Stanley Turrentine recorded the song as a smooth jazz fusion on his album The Man with the Sad Face, released in 1976.

Latin rapper Mellow Man Ace sampled this track and used it as the main melody for his single "Mentirosa" (1989).

Filipino rapper RapAsia sampled this track and used it as the main melody for his Tagalog single "Hoy! Tsismosa" (1991) for the self-titled album of the same name. It was released in the Philippines by Viva Records.

Alternative rock jam band Rusted Root performed "Evil Ways" on the soundtrack of the 1995 film Home for the Holidays.

Alex Gimeno sampled the riff from "Evil Ways" in his track "Funky Bikini" (1999) from his musical project titled Ursula 1000.

The song was used in the 2001 film The Fast and the Furious, and named in the credits.

Erroneous credit
On first pressings of both Santana's debut album and the single release, the songwriting credit was given to Jimmie Zack. Zack was a minor rockabilly artist out of the Midwest who recorded a song with the same title in 1960, credited as Jimmie Zack and the Blues Rockers. It was not the same song as recorded by Santana, however.

References

1967 songs
1969 singles
1970 singles
Santana (band) songs
Johnny Mathis songs
Columbia Records singles